Yazmin or Yazmín is a given name, and may refer to the following people:
Yazmin Aziz (born 2001), singer-songwriter
Yazmín Colón de Cortizo, first lady of Panama (2019–)
Yazmín Copete (1964–), Mexican politician
Yazmín Torrealba (1992–) Chilean footballer

See also

Spanish feminine given names